Ghursay.   གྷིར་སེ། Urdu غورسے is a village in district Ghanche, Pakistan . It is about 25 km away from district headquarter Khaplu. It was among the large settlements of Baltistan but river flood has reduced habitable areas. Ghursay village is also early settlement of Baltistan. The population is about 9000 people as of 2010. The people of Ghursay are locally known as Ghursaypa (as "pa" is used as a suffix to denote where a person belongs to in almost all Balti speaking settlements). There are two ways to reach Ghursay. One from the Machulu side and one from the Ghazithang side. However the Ghazithang side is most commonly used due to its ease. Ghursay lies in great plains of District Ghanche which is the largest plain in Gilgit Baltistan after Deosai plains. Due to its low lying land, the village as severely suffered losses due to river flood. No effective measures have been taken to reduce river flood. Should the flooding continue at present rate, the village will vanish in the next few decades as it happened once before the independence of Pakistan.
A large population of Ghursay are moving towards cities such as Karachi, Lahore, Rawalpindi and Skardu to seek better employment, education and to improve the living standards. The trend can be seen all over Baltistan.

Populated places in Ghanche District